The Chandler Court and Pollard Park Historic District is a national historic district located at Williamsburg, Virginia.  In 1996, it included 25 contributing buildings, 2 contributing sites, and 1 contributing structure deemed to contribute to the historic character of the area.  It was developed between 1922 and 1940, and represents the changing appearance of middle-class suburban housing.  The houses represent a variety of popular architectural styles including Colonial Revival, Tudor Revival, and Bungalow.

It was listed on the National Register of Historic Places in 1996.

References

Historic districts on the National Register of Historic Places in Virginia
Houses on the National Register of Historic Places in Virginia
Houses in Williamsburg, Virginia
National Register of Historic Places in Williamsburg, Virginia